The 2022–23 National Bank of Egypt SC season is the club's 72nd season in existence and the second consecutive season in the top flight of Egyptian football. In addition to the domestic league, National Bank will participate in this season's editions of the Egypt Cup and the EFA Cup.

Players

First-team squad

Out on loan

Transfers

In

Out

Pre-season and friendlies

Competitions

Overview

Egyptian Premier League

League table

Results summary

Results by round

Matches 
The league fixtures were announced on 9 October 2022.

Egypt Cup

EFA Cup

References

National Bank
2022 in African football
2023 in African football